The 1985 Canadian Professional Championship was a professional non-ranking snooker tournament, which took place in August 1985 in Toronto, Canada.

Cliff Thorburn won the title for the second year in a row, and third overall, by beating Bob Chaperon 6–4 in the final.

Main draw

References

Canadian Professional Championship
Canadian Professional Championship
Canadian Professional Championship
Canadian Professional Championship